Josipovac is a suburb of Osijek in Croatia. It is connected by the D2 highway. According to the 2011 census, it has 4,101 inhabitants. Josipovac has two churches, two graveyards, an elementary school, an ambulance and a lot more.

Populated places in Osijek-Baranja County